In materials chemistry, a binary phase or binary compound is a chemical compound containing two different elements. Some binary phase compounds are molecular, e.g. carbon tetrachloride (CCl4). More typically binary phase refers to extended solids.  Famous examples zinc sulfide, which contains zinc and sulfur, and tungsten carbide, which contains tungsten and carbon.

Phases with higher degrees of complexity feature more elements, e.g. three elements in ternary phases, four elements in quaternary phases.

References

Chemical compounds